Hrach Titizian (born May 26, 1979) is an American television, film and stage actor and producer. He is best known for his portrayal of CIA analyst Danny Galvez on the first two seasons of Showtime's Homeland.

Biography
Titizian was born in California to ethnic Armenian emigrant parents. His father was born in Lebanon and his mother in Jordan, while his grandparents were Armenians from Iraq and Syria. He grew up in Glendale, California. He attended Armenian school and is able to speak, read and write Armenian fluently.

As a child, Titizian would entertain family friends by singing and doing impersonations. He decided at age 19 to pursue a career as a professional actor, but did not inform his parents he had dropped out of college. He got a job delivering flowers to pay for drama lessons, and for nearly a year pretended he was still attending college. After he signed with an agent, his parents discovered his deception but Titizian refused to give up acting.

Filmography

Film

Television

Theatre

References

External links

1979 births
Living people
American people of Armenian descent
American people of Iraqi descent
American people of Jordanian descent
American people of Lebanese descent
American people of Syrian descent
Male actors from Glendale, California
21st-century American male actors
American male film actors
American male television actors
American male stage actors